Moon Hee-jung is a South Korean television screenwriter. She is best known for writing the dramas Last Scandal, Smile, You, Listen to My Heart, and Missing You.

Filmography
Goodbye Mr. Black (MBC, 2016)
Glorious Day (SBS, 2014)
Missing You (MBC, 2012-2013)
Listen to My Heart (MBC, 2011)
Smile, You (SBS, 2009-2010)
Last Scandal (MBC, 2008)
Tree of Heaven (SBS, 2006)
Outrageous Women (MBC, 2006)
Let's Go to the Beach (SBS, 2005)
Great Friends Season 2 (KBS2, 2001)

References

External links

Living people
South Korean screenwriters
South Korean television writers
Year of birth missing (living people)